Veckans Vimmel is a weekly magazine published in Sweden. It was a celebrity-oriented publication until 2004, when it was restarted as a girls' magazine. Elin Liljero served as the editor-in-chief of the magazine.

References

External links
www.magazino.se

Celebrity magazines
Magazines with year of establishment missing
Defunct magazines published in Sweden
Swedish-language magazines
Teen magazines
Weekly magazines published in Sweden
Magazines with year of disestablishment missing